Parkah & Durzo is an Italian DJ and producer duo composed of Alessandro Grasso and Gabriele D'Urzo. The group formed in 2019 and are known for their exploration of a diverse variety of genres that combine aspects of dance, electro, deep house, dance-pop, and slap house.

Personal life 

Alessandro, born October 8, 1997, in Castiglion Fiorentino, now resides in Florence.  After discovering David Guetta while searching for an ACF Fiorentina by the same name in 2007, which led him to begin music production .

Gabriele was born September 25, 1996, in Carpaneto Piacentino. Inspired by artists like Martin Garrix and Avicii, Gabriele began producing in 2012.

Career 
The duo met through a Facebook group titled This is EDM Crew where music fans could critique music. Alessandro complimented Gabriele's upload, and they then decided to collaborate remotely on the Piacenza-Florence axis.

In spring 2020, the duo were approached by DJ Matrix to collaborate on "Sono arrivati i caramba," along with DJ Matrix, Matt Joe and Amedeo Preziosi, which was then released on Musica da giostra - Volume 7. Later that year, the duo were contacted by Burak Yeter to officially release their remix of his song "Friday Night." Then, in March 2021, Parkah & Durzo won a Spinnin' Records Talent Pool competition which resulted in an official Amazon Music release of Timmy Trumpet's "Cold" through Spinnin' Records.

The duo are managed by WE ARE BLACK&WHITE. In 2021 the duo signed a contract with Sony Music Germany to release under the alias of R4GE , alongside Rudeejay and TAVA, who have collaborations with Alan Walker, Alok, Tujamo and Gigi D'agostino.

Discography

References

Italian DJs
Living people
Year of birth missing (living people)